A political crisis in El Salvador occurred on 1 May 2021 when the Legislative Assembly of El Salvador voted to remove several judges from the Supreme Court and remove the Attorney General of El Salvador, both of which had been vocal opponents to the presidency of Nayib Bukele. The event has been referred to as a self-coup by the opposition and by news media outlets due to the action itself but also because of the 2020 Salvadoran political crisis in the year prior, where Bukele ordered soldiers into the Legislative Assembly, which has also been characterized as a self-coup.

Background 

On 9 February 2020, Salvadoran President Nayib Bukele ordered forty soldiers to enter the Legislative Assembly to pressure its deputies to vote in favor of requesting a $109 million dollar loan from the United States in order to support his Territorial Control Plan, a law enforcement measure against crime in El Salvador. He sat in the chair of Mario Ponce, the President of the Legislative Assembly, and after a few minutes, exited the Legislative Assembly and informed a crowd of supporters: "We're going to give these scoundrels a week and if they haven't approved the plan by then, we convene them again," in reference to the politicians he needed to approve the loan request.

Small protests against Bukele formed following the incident, known in El Salvador as 9-F, however, many more Salvadorans spoke out on social media in support of Bukele. Lawmakers and the political opposition condemned Bukele's action as an attempted coup d'état. The Supreme Court of El Salvador also condemned his action and prohibited him from calling the Legislative Assembly and prohibited the Ministry of Defense to carry out any actions not allowed by the Constitution. The incident was cited as a case of democratic backsliding in El Salvador.

During the COVID-19 pandemic in El Salvador, Bukele had ordered the National Civil Police to arrest people for violating lockdown orders. The Constitutional Court, a part of the Supreme Court, ruled that arresting citizens for violating lockdown orders was illegal, however, Bukele openly rejected and ignored the court ruling. On 8 November 2020, Raúl Melara, the Attorney General of El Salvador, opened investigations into twenty of Bukele's government institutions for corruption.

Crisis 

On 28 February 2021, the 2021 Salvadoran legislative election resulted in a victory for Nuevas Ideas, Bukele's political party, which won 56 of the Legislative Assembly's 84 seats. The new session of the Legislative Assembly began on 1 May 2021. Ponce's term as President of the Legislative Assembly ended with the new session of the legislature, and the new session voted in Ernesto Castro as the new President of the Legislative Assembly with a margin of 64 votes in favor and 20 abstentions.

Following the vote of Castro, the Legislative Assembly then voted to remove all five judges of the Supreme Court's Constitutional Court which had opposed Bukele in the past, citing that they had previously "issued arbitrary decisions." The vote ended with 64 in favor, 19 in opposition, and 1 abstention. Elisa Rosales, a leader of Nuevas Ideas, stated that there was "clear evidence" that the judges had impeded government conduct and that they had to be removed to protect the public. Immediately after the vote, the five judges ruled the vote unconstitutional, but the judges were removed anyway. The judges who were removed were Óscar Armando Pineda Navas, the President of the Supreme Court, Aldo Enrique Cáder, Carlos Sergio Avilés, Carlos Ernesto Sánchez, and Marina de Jesús Marenco.

Later that same day, the Legislative Assembly also voted to remove Melara as Attorney General, and he later presented his resignation. Five new judges were appointed on 3 May 2021, all of whom were supporters of Bukele. The new judges were Óscar Alberto López Jerez, who replaced Pineda Navas as President of the Supreme Court, Luis Javier Suárez Magaña, Héctor Nahúm García, José Ángel Pérez Chacón, and Elsy Dueñas Lovos, and they were each given armed guards as personal bodyguards.

Aftermath and domestic reactions 

The voting out of the judges and the Attorney General has been labeled as a coup, a self-coup, a powerplay, and a power grab by several news outlets and the political opposition of El Salvador as it gave Bukele and Nuevas Ideas increased political power. It has also been labeled as a "threat to democracy."

Rene Portillo, a lawmaker of the Nationalist Republican Alliance (ARENA), stated, "What happened last night in the Legislative Assembly, with a majority that the people gave them through the vote, is a coup." Many of Bukele's supporters and followers, the Armed Forces of El Salvador, and the National Civil Police supported the actions of the Legislative Assembly.

International reactions 
Countries
:
Kamala Harris, the Vice President of the United States, stated that the United States government held "deep concerns" about democracy in El Salvador.
Antony Blinken, the United States Secretary of State, made a statement expressing "serious concern" regarding the removal of the Attorney General, adding, "Democratic governance requires respecting the separation of powers, for the good of all Salvadorans."
On 20 September, the U.S. announced that it was adding the five newly appointed magistrates to the United States’ Undemocratic and Corrupt Actors list.
Jim McGovern, the Representative of Massachusetts's 2nd congressional district, stated that he was "disturbed and angered" by the Legislative Assembly's action, adding, "this is not democracy, this is the destruction of an independent judiciary and the rule of law."
: Julio Borges, the Special Commissioner for Foreign Relations for Juan Guaidó, called Bukele's government a dictatorship, stating that "There are no good or bad dictatorships: there are dictatorships."

International organizations
 European Union: Josep Borrell, the High Representative of the Union for Foreign Affairs and Security Policy of the EU, expressed concern about the situation in El Salvador, stating that the removal of the judges and the Attorney General "put in doubt the rule of law [in El Salvador]."
 Organization of American States: The OAS condemned the action, stating: "the fullest respect for the democratic rule of law is essential."
 United Nations: Diego García Sayán, the United Nations' special investigator on the independence of legal systems, stated: "I condemn the steps the political power is taking to dismantle and weaken the judicial independence of the magistrates by removing the members of the constitutional chamber."

Other
Several human rights groups have condemned the action and accused Bukele of allowing the political crisis to happen. Juan Pappier, the Senior Americas researcher of Human Rights Watch, stated that Bukele had "dismantle[d] all the internal checks and balances on his power." The José Simeón Cañas Central American University (UCA) stated: "In this dark hour for our already weak democracy, the UCA calls for the defense of what was built after the war at the cost of so much effort and so many lives: a society where saying 'no' to power is not a fantasy."

See also 

2020 Salvadoran political crisis

Notes

References

Further reading
English
El Bukelazo: Shades of Dictatorship in El Salvador
El Salvador President Nayib Bukele is Flirting with Fascism
Is President Bukele a Reformer or an Autocrat?
President Bukele Grabs Dictatorial Powers in El Salvador

Spanish
Price of Salvadoran Bonds Plummets After "Bukelazo" on 1 May. What Does It Mean?
Who are the Magistrates and the Prosecutor Imposed by the Legislative Assembly?
Without Giving Statements, De Facto Magistrates Arrive at the Supreme Court

Political crisis
Salvadoran political crisis
Salvadoran political crisis, 2021
El Salvador
Political history of El Salvador
Nayib Bukele